
Gmina Kiwity is a rural gmina (administrative district) in Lidzbark County, Warmian-Masurian Voivodeship, in northern Poland.

Villages
Gmina Kiwity contains the villages and settlements of Bartniki, Czarny Kierz, Kiersnowo, Kierwiny, Kiwity, Klejdyty, Klutajny, Kobiela, Konity, Krekole, Maków, Napraty, Połapin, Rokitnik, Samolubie, Tolniki Wielkie and Żegoty.

Neighbouring gminas
Gmina Kiwity is bordered by the gminas of Bartoszyce, Bisztynek, Jeziorany and Lidzbark Warmiński.

References
Polish official population figures 2006

Kiwity
Lidzbark County